The seventh season of Bad Girls Club is titled Bad Girls Club: New Orleans and premiered on August 1, 2011, on Oxygen. Production of the season began in February 2011, and was located in New Orleans, Louisiana.

Production 
On February 16, 2011, it was reported that the production was using the home of former Hornets basketball coach Byron Scott in Kenner, Louisiana for what was then called "Bad Girls Boot Camp." Interim Code Enforcement Director Tamithia Shaw said "[she] understands the site will be used for four months, but that pre-production work apparently has been going on for two or three weeks." She said that the cast was not there. The news initially created outrage among the neighbors. This is the second season to take place in a different location from Los Angeles.  The production budget for the season was $6.5 million. 

In March 2011, three cast members modeled House of Lounge lingerie at New Orleans Fashion Week.

Controversy 
On March 13, 2011, TMZ.com reported that production was banned from at least eight clubs due to the clubs "not wanting to be associated with the show's bad image." The cast were not allowed to attend Pierre Thomas's Mardi Gras party at The Metropolitan Night Club.

On April 12, 2011, cast member Tasha Malek went to an on-duty cop outside the Bad Girls house to make a formal complaint against fellow cast member Nastasia Townsend. Malek told the cop that Townsend was placing her personal belongings into a garbage bag while telling her "she needed to leave the house," which escalated into a physical fight as they wrestled to the floor. The two were issued summons by the police for disturbing the peace and disorderly conduct.

Residence 

The cast lived at a house at 100 Chateau Saint Michel Drive, in Kenner, Louisiana, a suburb of New Orleans. According to Eyser's website, the 9,300-square-foot house, which was last sold in 2013 for $825,000 features 6 bedrooms, 7 bathrooms, a landscaped front garden, a pool, an entertainment room, and an outdoor bungalow. The residence was designed by production designer Jeff Eyser and set decorator Alexis Karpf. The official season 7 house tour was uploaded to YouTube on July 6, 2011. 

Eyser noted that everything in the main room, such as the indoor bar, was custom made. The walls were decorated with New Orleans artist Sarah Dunn's botanical paintings. The dining room was a small blue room with no doors and a large painting of New Orleans during the early 20th century. The kitchen, which featured a marble table, included furniture from IKEA. Unlike previous seasons where all bedrooms were not similar, these bedrooms looked the same. The make-up room featured early 20th-century furniture. Karpf said that the make-up room is her favorite and has an "industrial feel". In the same room, the girls were given Voodoo dolls that resembled themselves. The champagne room had dark furniture of a mixture of red and black pillows and sofas. In the middle of the room was a stripper pole. The back yard featured a pool table, swimming pool, lounge chairs and a pond.

Cast 
The season began with seven original bad girls, of which three were removed by production. One replacement bad girls was introduced in their absences later in the season.

Duration of Cast

Episodes

Notes

References

External links 
 
 

Bad Girls Club seasons
2011 American television seasons
Television shows set in New Orleans